Carpark North is the debut album by Danish electronic rock band Carpark North. It was released on 10 February 2003.

Two songs from the album were previously released: "There's a Place" in 2001 on the airwaves of Danish national radio, and "40 Days" on Carpark North's 40 Days EP.

The album was used as a soundtrack for the Danish teen-horror hit movie "Midsommer". The first single from the album, "Transparent & Glasslike" was an instant hit on the radio, and the album sold 10,000 units the first week. Over the following months the debut was certified platinum in Denmark, and the following Danish tour was sold out.

In 2005, the song "Homeland" was used in the hit American TV series Alias.

Track listing

Charts

References

2003 debut albums
Carpark North albums
Albums produced by Joshua (record producer)